The Alabama Homeland Security Act of 2003 (HSA, HB335) which was signed  on June 18, 2003, by Alabama governor Bob Riley, created the Alabama Department of Homeland Security.

See also
 Alabama Department of Homeland Security

References

External links
 Alabama Emergency Management and Homeland Security Statutory Authorities Summarized
 Code of Alabama 1975, §31-9A)

Alabama law